Road cycling was contested at the 2015 Military World Games. A total of six medal events were held.

Medal summary

Road cycling

Medal table

References

External links
Official website

2015 Military World Games
2015
Military World Games
Cycling in South Korea
2015 in road cycling